The Rebellious Novice is a 1972 Spanish-Mexican musical film directed by Luis Lucia and starring Rocío Dúrcal, Guillermo Murray and Isabel Garcés. It is a musical version of the 1889 novel Sister San Sulpicio by Armando Palacio Valdés. The plot follows the plight of Gloria, a dreamy (rather than rebellious) novice nun.

Cast

References

Bibliography
 Mira, Alberto. The A to Z of Spanish Cinema. Rowman & Littlefield, 2010.

External links 

1972 films
Spanish musical films
1970s musical films
1970s Spanish-language films
Films directed by Luis Lucia
Films scored by Gregorio García Segura
Films about Catholic nuns
Films based on Spanish novels
1970s Spanish films